"Dos Copas de Más" is a song written and recorded by the American musical duo Ha*Ash. Is the fifth single of the live album Primera Fila: Hecho Realidad by American duo Ha*Ash. The single was officially released on December 11, 2015. The music video of the song is the live performance by Ha*Ash in Estudios Churubusco (City México) on 7 July 2014. The song then included on their live album Ha*Ash: En Vivo (2019). It was written by Ashley Grace, Hanna Nicole and Pablo Preciado.

Background and release 
"Dos Copas de Más" was written by Ashley Grace, Hanna Nicole and Pablo Preciado and produced by George Noriega, Tim Mitchell and Pablo De La Loza. Is a song recorded by American duo Ha*Ash from her live album Primera Fila: Hecho Realidad. It was released as the fifth single from the album on December 11, 2015, by Sony Music Entertainment.

Music video 
A music video for "Dos Copas de Más" was released on March 27, 2015. It was directed by Nahuel Lerena. The video was filmed in Estudios Churubusco, City Mexico. , the video has over 83 million views on YouTube.

The second video for "Dos Copas de Más", recorded live for the live album Ha*Ash: En Vivo, was released on December 6, 2019. The video was filmed in Auditorio Nacional, Mexico City.

Commercial performance 
In Mexico, the song peaked at number three on the Mexican Singles Chart, and Monitor Latino. In 2017, the song was certified Gold in México. In March 2019, the songs was certified as Platinum in Mexico.

Credits and personnel 
Credits adapted from AllMusic.

Recording and management

 Recording Country: México
 Sony / ATV Discos Music Publishing LLC / Westwood Publishing
 (P) 2014 Sony Music Entertainment México, S.A. De C.V.

Ha*Ash
 Ashley Grace  – vocals, guitar, songwriting
 Hanna Nicole  – vocals, guitar, piano, songwriting
Additional personnel
 Ben Peeler  – Guitarra Lap Steel
 Pablo De La Loza  – co-production
 Paul Forat  – A&R. programming, production
 Ezequiel Ghilardi  – bass
 Pablo Preciado  – songwriting
 George Noriega  – producer
 Tim Mitchell  – producer

Charts

Certifications

Release history

References 

Ha*Ash songs
Songs written by Ashley Grace
Songs written by Hanna Nicole
Songs written by Pablo Preciado
Song recordings produced by George Noriega
Song recordings produced by Tim Mitchell
2015 singles
2015 songs
Spanish-language songs
Pop ballads
Sony Music Latin singles